Guui Station is a station on the Seoul Subway Line 2. Because of its proximity to the Gwangjin District Office (close to exit number 1), it is also known as Gwangjin-gu Office Station.

Station layout

Incident

References

Seoul Metropolitan Subway stations
Metro stations in Gwangjin District
Railway stations opened in 1980
1980 establishments in South Korea
20th-century architecture in South Korea